The Livestock and Equipment Barn of the Glenn Homestead is a historic farm outbuilding in rural northern White County, Arkansas.  It is located on the north side of Arkansas Highway 124, several miles east of the city of Pangburn.  It is a two-story frame structure, clad in novelty siding and set on a concrete foundation.  Its main section has a visually distinctive rounded roof, with open shed-roofed equipment wings on the sides.  Built about 1939, it is the only known round-roofed barn in the county.

The building was listed on the National Register of Historic Places in 1992.

See also
National Register of Historic Places listings in White County, Arkansas

References

Barns on the National Register of Historic Places in Arkansas
National Register of Historic Places in White County, Arkansas
1939 establishments in Arkansas
Buildings and structures completed in 1939